Rotokawau Virginia Lake is a lake in the city of Whanganui in the North Island of New Zealand. It is situated in the suburb of St Johns Hill in the north of the city.

The lake was called Virginia Lake for many years but in 2016 the Whanganui District Council voted to rename it Rotokawau Virginia Lake. Rotokawau is the Māori name for the lake of the black shag.

There are a number of attractions at the lake and surrounding reserve: the Higginbottom Fountain, winter garden in an Art Deco conservatory and a statue of Tainui.  Tainui was the daughter of a local chief, and the statue was sculpted by local sculptor Joan Morrell. In 2022 it was moved within the reserve to a site closer to the lake.  

A waka maumahara (memorial canoe) built of Corten steel and decorated by artist Cecelia Kumeroa was unveiled in 2020. It replaced an older canoe which was erected in memory of Pura McGregor, a Whanganui community leader and first Māori woman recipient of an MBE.

References 

Virginia

Further reading 

 "Virginia Lake". Wanganui Herald, Volume VIII, Issue 2539, 20 July 1875, p. 2
 "Virginia Lake: unveiling the statue of Tainui." Historical record (Wanganui, N.Z.), Nov 1978; v.9 n.2: p.3-6
 "The story of Roto Kawau" Mana tangata, Dec 1992/Jan 1993; n.14: p.27
 "Virginia Waters" Historical record (Wanganui, N.Z.), May 1970; v.1 n.1: p.48-51
 "Wanganui's Virginia Lake" New Zealand historic places, Sep 1995; n.55: p.14-16